Gary Oliver Kelly (born 9 July 1974) is an Irish former footballer who played his entire professional career with Leeds United.

He played as a right back or a right midfielder from 1992 until 2007 and made 531 appearances in total for Leeds, being the only player at Leeds to make more than 500 appearances from outside the stewardship of Don Revie.

Career
Kelly, the youngest of a family of 13, originally started playing football as a striker, and was reasonably successful in this position for Home Farm. However, when he joined Leeds, then boss Howard Wilkinson recognised qualities in him that would make a very good wing-back.

Kelly made his debut for Leeds in the 1991–92 season, although he did not become a regular in the side until the 1993–94 season, when Wilkinson made him his first choice right-back following the injury-induced retirement of Mel Sterland, occasionally filing in at centre back when needed.

He had played just twice in the 1991–92 season, when Leeds were champions of the last old Football League First Division before the FA Premier League was created, and did not qualify for a title winner's medal.

He was selected in the Premier League team of the season for the 1993–94 campaign.

By the end of that season, he had also played himself into Jack Charlton's Republic of Ireland squad that went to the 1994 World Cup in the USA. Kelly was one of the "Three Amigos" alongside Phil Babb and Jason McAteer whose youthful exuberance rejuvenated an ageing Irish squad. Kelly scored in a 2–0 victory over Germany in a warm-up friendly before those finals. Kelly was installed by George Graham as his skipper in the 1997–98 season, at the age of 23.

Kelly was generally a regular either at right back or right midfield in every subsequent season he played for Leeds, except for 1998–99, when shin splints ruined his season (this injury would reoccur in subsequent seasons). But Kelly forced his way back into the Leeds first team, in 1999–2000, making the right back role his own, despite the signing of Danny Mills in the summer of 1999. Kelly once again took over as skipper when Lucas Radebe was on international duty. He was rewarded with a testimonial match in May 2002, played against Celtic. The proceeds from this match were donated to several cancer charities chosen by Kelly (mainly Teenage Cancer Charity in Leeds and Cancer Support Centre in Drogheda), in dedication to his sister, Mandy, who died from the disease in 1998 aged only 35. Seen by a crowd of 26,440, Celtic won this match, which generated nearly £1million in receipts – making up the majority of the total £1.5million which was raised open a cancer centre in his native Drogheda.
He is also only the 10th player to ever make over 500 appearances for Leeds United, making the feat against Luton Town in Leeds' 2–1 victory at Elland Road on 25 February 2006.

Kelly played regularly in the first half of his 16th season at Leeds. But at that stage, he had fallen out with Ken Bates and new Leeds manager, Dennis Wise. On 26 October 2006, Wise revealed Shaun Derry was replacing Kelly as the new Leeds vice captain.

After 16 years of loyal service to the club, a presentation of a crystal cut vase was made to Kelly at the last home game of the 2006–07 season by former Leeds United players Paul Reaney, Allan Clarke, Mick Jones, and Frank Worthington.

International career
Kelly scored three goals in the 1992 UEFA European Under-18 Football Championship qualifiers and won 52 international caps playing for the Republic of Ireland scoring two goals, before his retirement from international football. He represented them at both the 1994 FIFA World Cup and 2002 FIFA World Cup.

Personal life
Kelly is the uncle of fellow Irish international and Leeds teammate Ian Harte. Kelly and Harte were both part of Ireland's 2002 World Cup squad. Kelly was also regarded amongst the Leeds squad as being a prankster and joker, having pulled several different stunts, including wearing Nicky Byrne of Westlife's clothes for a training session when Byrne had got changed to join in with the training session. Byrne used to be part of the youth team set up at Leeds United during the mid-1990s, and is a friend of Kelly.

Career statistics

Club

International goals
Scores and results list Ireland's goal tally first, score column indicates score after each Kelly goal.

Honours
Individual
 PFA Team of the Year: 1993–94 Premier League, 1999–2000 Premier League, 2005–06 Football League Championship

See also
One-club man

References

External links

1974 births
Living people
People from Drogheda
Association footballers from County Louth
Republic of Ireland association footballers
Republic of Ireland under-21 international footballers
Republic of Ireland youth international footballers
Republic of Ireland international footballers
Association football fullbacks
Drogheda United F.C. players
Home Farm F.C. players
Leeds United F.C. players
Premier League players
English Football League players
1994 FIFA World Cup players
2002 FIFA World Cup players
Republic of Ireland men's futsal players